Edward Harrison Taylor (April 23, 1889 – June 16, 1978) was an American herpetologist from Missouri.

Family
Taylor was born in Maysville, Missouri, to George and Loretta Taylor. He had an older brother, Eugene.

Education
Taylor studied at the University of Kansas in Lawrence, Kansas, graduating with a B.A. in 1912. Field trips during his time at the University of Kansas with Dr. Clarence McClung and Dr. Roy Moody helped prepare Taylor for his future endeavors.

Between 1916 and 1920 he returned briefly to Kansas to finish his M.A.

Career
Upon completing his bachelor's degree, Taylor went to the Philippines, where at first he held a teacher's post in a village in central Mindanao. He collected and studied the local herpetofauna extensively and published many papers. He returned to the Philippines after completing his master's degree and was appointed Chief of Fisheries in Manila. On his many survey trips he continued collecting and studying fishes and reptiles of the islands.

In 1927, back in the United States, he became the head of the zoology department of the University of Kansas at Lawrence. From 1929 to 1936, he studied the taxonomy of the genus Eumeces (some common skinks). Subsequently, he focused on Mexican herpetofauna, which he explored on many field trips from 1937 to 1948. In the following years, his explorations took him to Costa Rica, Sri Lanka and Thailand, and he published extensively on all these countries. In 1965, he turned his attention onto Caecilians after having discovered a new species on an island in the Sea of Celebes.

Along with his scientific career, Taylor was attached to intelligence operations. After World War I, he was sent to Siberia to follow the Russian Revolution under the cover of a Red Cross mission to stop a typhus epidemic. During World War II, the OSS employed Taylor to teach jungle survival in British Ceylon.

Research
Taylor described about 120 reptile species that are still recognized today, most of them from the Philippine Islands, but many others from Mexico and other parts of the world.

Eponymous taxa
Nine reptile species named in E.H.Taylor's honor are still recognized as valid:   Turtles: Trachemys taylori (Cuatrociénegas slider, from Coahuila, Mexico); Lizards: Anolis taylori (Taylor's anole, from Guerrero, Mexico), Cyrtodactylus edwardtaylori (Badulla bow-fingered gecko, from Sri Lanka), Dibamus taylori (Lesser Sunda blind lizard, from Lombok to Wetar),  Lankascincus taylori (Taylor's tree skink, from Sri Lanka),  Sceloporus edwardtaylori (Taylor's spiny lizard, from Oaxaca, Mexico), Sphenomorphus taylori (Taylor's wedge skink, from Bougainville, Papua New Guinea), ; Snakes: Agkistrodon taylori (ornate cantil, from Tamaulipas, Mexico),  Pseudorabdion taylori (Taylor's reedsnake, from Mindanao, Philippines). Gekko taylori (Taylor's gecko, from Thailand) has been synonymized with Gekko siamensis (Siamese green-eyed gecko).

Eleven reptile subspecies named in E.H.Taylor's honor are still recognized as valid: Lizards: Brachymeles boulengeri taylori (Negros short-legged skink, from Philippines), Gerrhonotus liocephalus taylori (Taylor's alligator lizard, from Chihuahua, Mexico), Lipinia pulchella taylori (Negros beautiful lipinia, a skink from the Philippines), Sceloporus occidentalis taylori (Sierra fence lizard, from California), Sphenomorphus assatus taylori (Taylor's forest skink, from southern Mexico), Uta stansburiana taylori (Taylor's side-blotched lizard, from Mexico); Snakes: Coniophanes picevittis taylori (Taylor's black-striped snake, from Mexico), Cyclocorus nuchalis taylori (Taylor's southern triangle-spotted snake, from southern Philippines), Ficimia publia taylori* (Taylor's blotched hooknose snake, from Yucatán, Mexico), Lampropeltis triangulum taylori (Utah milksnake, from USA), Micrurus browni taylori (Acapulco coralsnake, from Guerrero, Mexico). *This subspecies is not widely recognised.

Eight amphibian species named in E.H.Taylor's honor are still recognized as valid: Frogs: Hyalinobatrachium taylori (Taylor's glass frog, from the Guianas), Platymantis taylori Taylor's direct-breeding frog, Sierra Madre, Luzon, Philippines), Craugastor taylori (Taylor's robber frog, from Chaipas, Mexico), Lithobates taylori (Peralta frog, from eastern Nicaragua & Costa Rica); Salamanders: Ambystoma taylori (Taylor's salamander, a neotenic salamander from Puebla, Mexico), Bolitoglossa taylori (Cerro Cituro salamander, from Darien, Panama), Oedipina taylori (Taylor's worm salamander, from Guatemala, El Salvador & Honduras); Caecilians: Microcaecilia taylori (Taylor's caecilian, from Suriname).

Publications
Taylor's autobiographical memoir Edward H. Taylor: Recollection of an Herpetologist was published by the University of Kansas Museum of Natural History in 1975 [Monograph Series, Publication 4:1-160] with contributions from A. Byron Leonard, Hobart M. Smith and George R. Pisani.

See also
 :Category:Taxa named by Edward Harrison Taylor

References

Further reading
Webb RG (1978). "Edward Harrison Taylor 1989-1978". Herpetologica 34 (4): 422–425.
Duellman WE (1978). "Edward Harrison Taylor, 1889-1978". Copeia 1978 (4): 737–738.
Adler, Kraig (1989). Contributions to the History of Herpetology. Society for the Study of Amphibians and Reptiles. 
Pethiyagoda R (2007). Pearls, Spices and Green Gold. An Illustrated History of Biodiversity Exploration in Sri Lanka''. WHT Publications.

External links
University of Kansas, Kenneth Spencer Research Library: Guide to the Edward H. Taylor Collection
 
 

American herpetologists
American taxonomists
1889 births
1978 deaths
University of Kansas alumni
People from Maysville, Missouri
20th-century American zoologists